The 2016 Ohio Aviators season was the first in the club's history. Coached by Paule Barford and captained by Jamie Mackintosh, Ohio competed in the United States  2016 PRO Rugby competition.

In 2016, Ohio jerseys were made by Champion System.

Fixtures
All home matches were played at Memorial Park in Obetz.

Ladder

Ladder progression

Player scoring

Top points scorers

Top try scorers

Updated: May 30, 2016

Squad

Staff
 Head coach: Paule Barford 
 Assistant coach: Paul Holmes
 Assistant coach: Eamonn Hogan

Transfers

References

Rugby union in Ohio
2016 in sports in Ohio
Ohio